USNS Adventurous (T-AGOS-13) was a Stalwart-class modified tactical auxiliary general ocean surveillance ship of the United States Navy in service from 1988 to 1992. She was in non-commissioned service in the Military Sealift Command from 1988 to 1992, operating during the final years of the Cold War. She was transferred to the National Oceanic and Atmospheric Administration (NOAA) in 1992 and in 2003 was commissioned into service with NOAA as the fisheries research ship NOAAS Oscar Elton Sette (R 335).

Construction 

The U.S. Navy awarded the contract to build Adventurous to VT Halter Marine, Inc., on 5 April 1985. She was laid down on at VT Halter Marines shipyard at Moss Point, Mississippi, on 19 December 1985 and launched on 23 September 1987. VT Halter Marine delivered her to the Navy on 19 August 1988.

U.S. Navy service 

The U.S. Navy placed the ship in non-commissioned service with the Military Sealift Command upon delivery as USNS Adventurous (T-AGOS-13). Designed to collect underwater acoustical data in support of anti-submarine warfare operations, Adventurous spent the final years of the Cold War towing sonar equipment to hunt for Soviet Navy submarines. She operated with a mixed crew of Navy personnel and civilian merchant mariners.

The Cold War ended with the collapse of the Soviet Union in late December 1991. The Navy withdrew Adventurous from service on 5 June 1992 and struck her from the Naval Vessel Register the same day.

National Oceanic and Atmospheric Administration service

Acquisition and conversion 
 On the same day the Navy took her out of service, the ship was transferred to the National Oceanic and Atmospheric Administration (NOAA). NOAA originally intended to assign the ship the hull number R 331 and to convert her for use as a survey ship, but after a stint as a platform for basic training in 1993 she was laid up without having undergone any modifications. She remained inactive until October 2001, when she arrived at Jacksonville, Florida, to undergo conversion at the Atlantic Dry Dock Corporation for use as a fisheries research ship. Her conversion was completed in October 2002, and she proceeded to Honolulu, Hawaii, where she was commissioned on 23 January 2003 as  NOAAS Oscar Elton Sette (R 335). She replaced the decommissioned fisheries research ship NOAAS Townsend Cromwell (R 443).

Characteristics and capabilities 

Oscar Elton Sette has a 150-square-foot (sq. ft.) (13.9-square-meter) (m2) wet laboratory, a 100-sq.-ft. (9.3-m2) dry laboratory, a 100-sq.-ft. (9.3-m2) electronics and computer laboratory, and a 50-sq.-ft. (4.6-m2) hydrographic laboratory. She also has a 50-sq.-ft. (4.6-m2) scientific freezer and a 50-sq.-ft. (4.6-m2) store room.

Oscar Elton Sette carries a  SOLAS-approved rescue boat with a 315-horsepower (235-kilowatt) motor and a capacity of six people, two 17-foot rigid-hulled inflatable boats (RHIBs), each with a 115-horsepower (86-kilowatt) motor and a capacity of seven people, and three 18-foot inflatable boats, each with a 50-horsepower (37-kilowatt) motor and a capacity of 11 people.

To enhance the safety of underwater diving operations in remote areas, Oscar Elton Sette has a recompression chamber to allow immediate treatment of divers showing symptoms of decompression sickness ("the bends").

In addition to her crew of 22, Oscar Elton Sette can accommodate up to 20 scientists.

Service history 

From her home port of Honolulu, Oscar Elton Sette operates throughout the central and western Pacific Ocean in support of the Pacific Islands Fisheries Science Center, also located in Honolulu and a component of NOAAs National Marine Fisheries Service (NMFS). She conducts fisheries assessment surveys, physical and chemical oceanography, marine mammal projects, and coral reef research, collecting fish and crustaceans using bottom trawls, longlines, and fish traps. She uses plankton nets and surface and mid-water laval nets to collect plankton, fish larvae, and eggs. She also routinely supports underwater diving operations.

Oscar Elton Sette also is actively involved in NMFS Honolulu Coral Reef Restoration cruises, which concentrate scientific efforts on removing discarded marine debris and commercial fishing gear from fragile coral reefs, as well as on classifying and analyzing the density of the debris and discarded gear.

References

Notes

Bibliography
 Wertheim, Eric. The Naval Institute Guide to Combat Fleets of the World, 15th Edition: Their Ships, Aircraft, and Systems. Annapolis, Maryland: Naval Institute Press, 2007. .

External links
 
NavSource Online: Service Ship Photo Archive: T-AGOS-13 Adventurous; NOAA Ship Oscar Elton Sette (R-335) 
noaa.gov NOAA Ship Oscar Elton Sette

 

Stalwart-class ocean surveillance ships
Cold War auxiliary ships of the United States
Ships built in Moss Point, Mississippi
1987 ships
Ships of the National Oceanic and Atmospheric Administration
NOAA ex-U.S. Navy Stalwart-class oceanographic research ships
Fisheries science